Martin Hiden (born 11 March 1973 in Stainz) is a former Austrian football player, who is currently assistant coach at FC Pasching.

Club career
He played for clubs such as Sturm Graz, SV Salzburg (where he claimed his first league title), Rapid Wien, Leeds United (England) and Austria Wien. Joining Leeds United in 1998, he was the first-ever Austrian outfield player (goalkeeper Alex Manninger joined Arsenal in 1997) to play in the Premier League. From 2003 he returned to Rapid Wien, winning the Austrian championship once more in 2005.

In 2006, he was announced as the new captain of Rapid (after a short period with goalkeeper Helge Payer as captain, who did not feel comfortable in the role that was given him after the departure of Steffen Hofmann), and in 2007, after the injuries of Andreas Ivanschitz and Martin Stranzl, he was also made captain of the national team for two matches.

International career
He made his debut for Austria in a March 1998 friendly match against Hungary and was a participant at the 1998 FIFA World Cup but did not play. He earned 50 caps, scoring one goal. He also was part of the Euro 2008 squad.

Coaching career

Hiden has a UEFA B License. He was head coach of FC Pasching from 5 September 2013 to when he was appointed interim head coach of LASK Linz. His first match was a 3–1 win against Villacher SV. His final match was a 3–1 win against Union Gurten. Hiden was named interim head coach of LASK Linz after Karl Daxbacher was sacked. The club had won two of their last eight matches and lost one of their last six. In his debut on 17 March 2015, Linz and SV Horn finished in a 1–1 draw.

Career statistics

National team statistics

International goal
Scores and results list Austria's goal tally first.

Coaching record

Honours
Austrian Football Bundesliga (4):
 1995, 2003, 2005, 2008
Austrian Cup (2):
 1997, 2003

References

External links
 
 Player profile – EURO2008
 
 Profile and stats – Austria Archive
 Stats – Rapid Archive
 National Football Teams
 

1973 births
Living people
People from Deutschlandsberg District
Austrian footballers
Austria international footballers
Austrian expatriate footballers
Expatriate footballers in England
1998 FIFA World Cup players
UEFA Euro 2008 players
SK Sturm Graz players
FC Red Bull Salzburg players
SK Rapid Wien players
Leeds United F.C. players
FK Austria Wien players
FC Kärnten players
Austrian Football Bundesliga players
Premier League players
Association football defenders
Footballers from Styria
Austrian expatriate sportspeople in England